A list of cities, towns and villages in Ardabil Province of north-western Iran:

Main cities
Ardabil (Pop. 340,386 (2001))
Bileh Savar (Pop. 13,253 (2001))
Germi (Pop. 30,000 (est))
Givi (or "Kivi")
Khalkhal 
Meshgin Shahr 
Namin 
Nir 
Parsabad (Pop. 48,147 (2001))
Sareyin

Alphabetical
Cities are in bold text; all others are villages.

A
Abadabad | Abazar | Abbas Alilu | Abbas Kandi | Abbas Qeshlaqi | Abbasabad | Abbasali Kandi | Abdol Rezaabad | Ab-e Garm-e Givy | Abi Beyglu | Abr Bakuh | Adam Darrehsi-ye Olya | Adam Darrehsi-ye Sofla | Afchi | Afshar-e Olya | Afsuran | Aftabeh | Agh Bad-e Gaduk | Agh Bolagh-e Mostafa Khan | Agh Bolagh-e Olya | Agh Bolagh-e Sofla | Agh Davahlu-ye Olya | Agh Tappeh | Agh Zaman Kandi | Aghbolagh | Aghcheh Kohol | Aghcheh Qeshlaq | Aghcheh Qeshlaq-e Olya | Aghcheh Qeshlaq-e Sofla | Agricultural Research Station | Ahad Beyglu | Ahl-e Iman | Ahmad Beyglu | Ahmadabad | Ahmadabad | Ahmadabad | Ahu Qaleh | Ahu | Ainalu | Ajghaz | Ajirlu | Akbar Davud-e Qeshlaqi | Akbar Kandi | Akbarabad | Al Qanab | Ala ol Din | Alachiq Tapahsi | Aladizgeh | Alamdar | Alamlu Shah Ali | Alamlu Tabriz | Alankash | Alardeh | Aldashin | Alhashem-e Olya | Alhashem-e Sofla | Ali Bolaghi | Ali Kahrizi | Ali Kahrizi | Ali Kamar | Ali Khan Kandi | Ali Mohammadlu | Ali Mohammadlu | Ali Qapu | Ali Qeshlaqi | Ali Shansuyi | Ali Verdilu | Aliabad | Aliabad | Aliabad | Aliabad | Aliabad | Alikaran | Alilah | Alileh Sar | Alishan Qeshlaqi | Allah Yarlu | Allahlu | Almagalan | Almas | Alni | Alu | Aluch | Alucheh-ye Fuladlu | Alucheh-ye Sabalan | Alvars | Aminabad | Aminlu | Amir Kandi | Amir Khanlu | Amirabad | Amirabad | Amrahlu | Amuqin | Amurab Moghan Lake Camp | Anaviz | Anbaran | Anbaran-e Olya | Anbarlu | Andabil | Andar Ab | Andazaq | Angurd | Angurtlar-e Sofla | Ani-ye Olya | Ani-ye Sofla | Ani-ye Vosta | Anjirlu | Anjirlu | Anzab-e Olya | Anzab-e Sofla | Anzan | Aq Bash | Aq Bolagh | Aq Bolagh-e Aqajan Khan | Aq Bolagh-e Rostam Khani | Aq Bulagh | Aq Daraq | Aq Daraq | Aq Divar | Aq Guni | Aq Qabaq-e Olya | Aq Qabaq-e Sofla | Aq Qabaq-e Vosta | Aq Qaleh | Aq Qaleh | Aq Qasemlu | Aqa Baqer | Aqa Beyglu | Aqa Hasan Beyglu | Aqa Mirlu | Aqa Mohammad Beyglu | Aqa Morad | Aqa Yarlu | Aqchay-e Olya | Aqchay-e Sofla | Aqchay-e Vosta | Aqcheh Kand | Aqchehlu | Aqdash-e Olya | Aqdash-e Sofla | Aqsu | Arablu Kandi | Arablu | Aralluy-e Bozorg | Aralluy-e Kuchek | Aranchi | Arbab Kandi | Ardabil | Ardabilaq | Ardi | Ardi Musa | Arjaq | Arjestan | Arkhazlu | Armarmshahadlu | Arpa Chai | Arpa Tappehsi | Arseh Dowgah | Arsun | Arvanaq | Arzanaq | Asad Kandi | Asad Qeshlaqi Shomareh-ye Seh | Asad Qeshlaqi-ye Do | Asad Qeshlaqi-ye Yek | Asadabad | Asb-e Marz | Asbu | Asfaranjan | Asghar Khanlu | Askestan | Aski Shahr | Aslan Duz | Asmarud | Asrabad | At Tutan | Atashgah | Atashgah-e Jadid | Ayaz Kandi | Ayuriq | Ayvazlu | Azadabad | Azadlu | Azhdarlu | Azimabad | Azizabad | Azizabad | Azizlu

B
Babak | Babi Kandi | Babian | Bafrajerd | Baghcheh Chiq | Bagheshlu Kandi | Bagheshlu | Bahramabad | Balakhan Kandi | Balil | Ballujeh Mirak | Balu Qayah | Balut Kandi | Banafsheh Daraq | Baqarabad | Baqerlu | Barandaq | Barezil | Baris | Barkchay | Baruq | Bashirlui-ye Olya | Bashirlui-ye Sofla | Bayram Badani | Beik Baghi | Belqeysabad | Benamaran | Beneh Lar | Beneh | Benmar-e Sabalan | Beris | Beyg Baghlu | Beyraq | Biaraq | Bijaq | Bil Dashi | Bilah Daraq | Bileh Daraq | Bileh Savar | Bolus | Boneh Khalkhal | Bonyadabad | Borjelu | Borjelu | Borran-e Olya | Borran-e Sofla | Borun Qeshlaq-e Olya | Borun Qeshlaq-e Sofla | Budalalu | Buran | Burestan | Burkabad | Busjin | Buyaqchilu | Buzcheh-ye Olya | Buzcheh-ye Sofla | Buzcheh-ye Vosta

C
Chaghungenesh | Chakhar Chamani | Chakhmaq Chukhur | Chalak | Chalambar | Chalgarud | Chalmeh Kandi | Chamlu Gabin | Chanaq-e Sofla va Olya | Chanbalu Qeshlaq | Chanzab | Chanzanaq | Chapaqan | Charapa | Charchelu | Charuq Dash | Chat Qayah | Chat Qeshlaq-e Bala | Chay Seqerlu | Chebenlu | Chehel Gaz | Chehreh Barq | Chenaq Bolagh | Chenaqrud | Chenar | Chenar | Chenar | Chenar | Chenarlaq | Cher Cher | Chuneh Khanlu | Chungenesh | Chunzeh-ye Olya | Chunzeh-ye Sofla | Chupan Qeshlaqi

D
Dabanlu | Dadeh Beyglu | Dagermandaraq | Dagh Kandi | Dagh Kandi-ye Olya | Dagmeh Daghildi | Dalik Yarqan | Dalikli Dash | Dalilu | Dam Qoli | Damdabaja | Damdol | Damirchi Darrehsi-ye Olya | Damirchi Darrehsi-ye Sofla | Damirchilu | Damirchi-ye Kharabahsi | Damirchi-ye Olya | Damirchi-ye Sofla | Danial | Darabad | Dargahlu | Darin Kabud | Darmanlu | Darreh Beyglu | Darreh Gahlui-ye Barzand | Darvish-e Gurnamaz | Daryaman | Dash Bolagh | Dash Bolagh | Dash Bolagh-e Barzand | Dash Bolaghi | Dash Bolaq Kandi | Dash Kasan | Dash Qapu | Dashdibi | Dashli Daraq | Dashlujeh | Dasht Andar | Dastgir | Davahchi-ye Olya | Davahchi-ye Sofla | Davil | Dayu Kandi | Delik Yarqan | Derow | Deylamabad | Dijujin | Dikdaraq | Dikdash | Dim Seqerlu | Diman | Divlaq | Diz | Diz | Dizaj | Domdomeh | Dovarjin | Dowgar | Dowlatabad | Dowlatabad | Dowlatabad | Dowshanlu | Dudaran | Duh Darrehsi | Dumuli | Dushan Bolaghi | Dust Beyglu | Dust Kandi

E
Eba Beyglu | Ebli-ye Olya | Ebli-ye Sofla | Ebrahim Kandi | Ebrahim Kandi | Ebrahim Kandi-ye Olya | Ebrahim Kandi-ye Sofla | Ebrahim Kandi-ye Vosta | Ebrahimabad-e Jadid | Edalat Qeshlaqi | Emarat | Emaratlui-ye Olya | Emamzadeh Seyyed Ebrahim | Eslam Kandi | Eslamabad | Eslamabad-e Jadid | Eslamabad-e Qadim | Eslamabad-e Sofla | Esmail Kandi | Esmail Kandi-ye Do | Esmail Kandi-ye Yek | Esmaili Kandi | Eynallah Kandi | Ezmareh-ye Olya | Ezmareh-ye Sofla

F
Fakhrabad | Farab | Farajabad | Farkhlu | Farzi Kandi | Fath-e Maqsud | Feshlaq Aghdash Hajji Saram | Firuzabad | Firuzabad | Firuzabad | Forudgah Ardabil | Fulad Luqui

G
Gachi Bolaghi-ye Sofla | Gadeh Kahriz | Galasan Gurasan | Galin Bolaghi | Galin Qeshlaqi | Gandomabad | Ganduz | Ganjgah | Garjan | Garm Cheshmeh | Garm Khaneh | Garmi Angut | Gavan | Gavar Qaleh | Gavdul | Gazir | Gazvar-e Olya | Gazvar-e Sofla | Gechi Qeshlaq Amirlu | Gechi Qeshlaq Hajj Mohammadlu | Gedaylu | Gelan Daraq-e Sofla | Gelgelab | Gellar-e Mohammad Hasan | Gellar-e Mohammad Taqi | Gendishmin | Genlujeh | Gerdeh Gol | Gerdeh | Germi | Gezaz | Ghaffar Kandi | Ghafurabad | Gharib Hajji | Gholam Hoseyn Kandi | Gigal | Gilan Deh | Gilanduz | Gilarlu | Gilavan | Gol Cheshmeh | Gol Moghan | Gol Qeshlaq | Gol Tappeh | Gol Tappeh | Gol Tappeh-ye Malali | Golestan | Goli Bolagh-e Olya | Goli Bolagh-e Sofla | Goli Daraq-e Olya | Goli Daraq-e Sofla | Goli Jan | Goli | Golli | Gollu | Golujeh | Golujeh | Golujeh | Gonsul Kandi | Gorgabad | Gowdah Kahriz | Gowdlar | Gowg Tappeh | Gowzalli | Gugarchin | Gugeh | Gun Papaq | Gun Papaq-e Olya | Guni Kand | Guni Kandi | Guradel | Guran Sarab | Gurdigol | Gurdigol-e Nur ed Din | Gurshad Kandi | Gushlu

H
Habash | Hachakand-e Darmanlu | Hachakand-e Tazeh | Hadi Beyglu | Hadilu | Haft Cheshmeh | Hajj Ahmad Kandi | Hajj Amir Kandi | Hajj Hasan Kandi | Hajji Abbas Kandi | Hajji Aqa Kandi | Hajji Aqam Ali Kandi | Hajji Baba Khan | Hajji Bala Beyglu | Hajji Esmail Iman Khan | Hajji Havar Kandi | Hajji Jafar Kandi | Hajji Mahmud | Hajji Morteza Kandi | Hajji Nowrush Kandi | Hajji Qadart Kandi | Hajji Seyflu | Hajji Siab Kandi | Hajjiabad | Hajjilu | Hakim Qeshlaqi | Hallajabad | Hamdollahabad | Hameh Shan | Hamidabad | Hamlabad | Hammamlu | Hamvar Kandi | Hamzah Khanlu | Haram | Hasan Baruq | Hasan Kandi | Hasan Khan Darrehsi | Hasanabad | Hasanali Kandi | Hasanlu | Hashatjin | Hava Daraq | Havar Kandi Qeshlaqi | Havas Kandi | Havashanq | Hefzabad | Helabad | Heris | Hesar | Heshi | Heshin | Heybat-e Jahan Khanemlu | Heybat-e Olya | Heybat-e Sofla | Heydarabad | Hezar Kandi | Hiq | Hir | Hizan | Hoseyn Khan Kandi | Hoseyn Khanlu | Hoseyn Qeshlaqi Gurabazlu | Hoseyn Qeshlaqi Hajj Khvajehlu | Hoshneh | Hur

I
Idir-e Olya | Idir-e Sofla | Ilkhanlar | Ilkhchi | Ilkhchi | Ilkhchi-ye Olya | Ilkhchi-ye Sofla | Ilvanaq | Imir | Inallu | Incheh | Incheh | Iranabad | Irenji | Iril | Isti Baghcheh

J
Jabah Dar | Jabbarlu | Jabdaraq | Jabilu | Jablu | Jafarabad | Jafarabad | Jafarabad | Jafarlu | Jahan Khanamlu | Jahangirlu | Jalalabad | Jalayer | Jamadi | Jamalabad | Jamayran | Jamulu Kandi | Jamush Olan-e Olya | Jamush Olan-e Sofla | Jangan | Jebar Kandi | Jeda | Jegar Kandi | Jeqjeq-e Olya | Jeqjeq-e Vosta | Jeyd | Jiavan | Jin Kandi | Jin Qeshlaqi | Joghanab | Jolowgir | Jurab

K
Kabudchi | Kachal Daraq | Kachalar | Kadkhodalu | Kaftareh | Kahel Qeshlaq | Kahran | Kahriz | Kajal | Kalan | Kalanpa | Kalansura | Kalantar | Kalar | Kalash-e Bozorg | Kaleh Sar | Kalestan-e Olya | Kalestan-e Sofla | Kalhor | Kalkhuran | Kalkhuran Sheykh | Kalkhvoran-e Viyand | Kalleh Sar-e Olya | Kalleh Sar-e Sofla | Kamalabad | Kamar Qayah | Kamar | Kamiabad | Kampab Mantqehi Maghan | Kanchubeh | Kandeh Kandi | Kandovan | Kangarlu | Kanzaq | Karamlu | Karandaq | Kard Kandi | Kareh Nab | Kargan | Kargazlu | Karimlu | Karin | Karkaraq | Karkasheh | Karnaq | Kavich | Kazaj | Kazemabad | Kazemlu | Kehel | Keheldasht | Kejin | Keleh Daraq | Kenazaq | Keram Kandi | Keriq | Keriq-e Bozorg | Khademlu | Khakriz | Khalaj | Khalfehlu | Khalifeh Davud | Khalifehlu Kandi-ye Bozorg | Khalifehlu | Khalifehlu | Khalil Kandi | Khalilabad | Khalkhal | Khames | Khan Baba Kandi | Khan Bolaghi | Khan Kandi | Khan Kandi | Khan Mohammadlu | Khan Qeshlaqi | Khan Qeshlaqi-ye Yek | Khanali Darrehsi | Khaneh Shir | Khaneqah | Khaneqah-e Bafrajerd | Khaneqah-e Gilavan | Khaneqah-e Olya | Khaneqah-e Sadat | Khaneqah-e Sofla | Khani Babalu | Khanjar | Khankandi | Khanlar Qeshlaqi Hajj Bala Beyglu | Khanlar Qeshlaqi-ye Hajj Alam Qoli | Khanom Alilu | Khanom Bala Kandi | Kharabeh Razi | Kharabeh-ye Kohal | Kharabeh-ye Qaderlu | Khasheh Heyran | Khat Parast | Khiarak | Khodaqoli Qeshlaq | Khoraim | Khordeh Qeshlaq | Khorramabad | Khoshkeh Rud | Khujin | Khush Nameh | Khvajeh Bolaghi | Khvajehim | Khvor Khvor-e Olya | Khvorshidabad | Khvoshabad | Kinu | Kivi, Iran | Kivi | Kohneh Kand | Kol Tappeh | Koleh Digeh | Koli | Koli-ye Olya | Koli-ye Sofla | Kolleh Sar | Kolosh | Kolowr | Kolur | Komoq | Kord Kandi | Kord Lar | Kord Qeshlaqi | Kordali | Kordeh Deh | Kuh Kenar | Kuhsareh | Kujanaq | Kulan Kuh | Kulatan | Kur Abbaslu | Kur Bolagh | Kuraim | Kuramalu | Kurlar | Kuzah Topraqi

L
Lachin Darrehsi | Lahrud | Lajayer | Lakandasht | Lakarabad-e Olya | Lakarabad-e Sofla | Lal Ganj | Laleh Bolaghi | Lameh Dasht | Lanjabad | Laskeh Daraq | Lataran | Lay | Lehaq | Lekvan | Lengehbiz | Lerd | Limlu | Lombar | Lonbar | Lorun | Luleh Daraq-e Hajj Najaf

M
Mahbub Kandi | Mahmudabad | Mahmudabad | Mahmudabad | Mahmudabad | Mahmudabad-e Taleqani | Majandeh | Majareh | Majdar | Majidabad | Majidabad | Majidlu | Majulan | Malqeshlaqi | Manamin | Mansurlu | Maqsudlu-ye Olya | Maqsudlu-ye Sofla | Maqsudlu-ye Vosta | Marallui-ye Kalbalu | Marallu-ye Jafarqoli Khanlu | Marani | Mardan | Mashhadlu | Mashiran | Mashkul | Masjed-e Mahalleh | Masjedlu | Masjedlu | Masjedlu | Mastanabad | Masumabad | Mayeh Darrahsi | Mazafa | Mazar-e Pileh Sehran | Mazraeh | Mazraeh-ye Ali Goshad Fakri | Mazraeh-ye Ayshaq Chekhmaz | Mazraeh-ye Bezaqa | Mazraeh-ye Jahan | Mazraeh-ye Khalaf | Mazraeh-ye Khanlar | Mehdi Khanlu | Mehdi Posti | Mehmandust-e Olya | Mehmandust-e Sofla | Mejmir | Melli Kandi | Meresht | Mesdaraq | Meshginshahr | Meykhvosh | Meymand | Mezajin | Mian Rudan | Mijandi | Mikail Darrehsi | Mikailabad | Mil Aghardan | Minabad | Mir Alilu | Mir Hoseynlu | Mir Jafarlu | Mir Kandi | Mir Qahremanlu | Mirahjin | Mirani | Mirverdi Kandi | Mirza Hasan Kandi | Mirza Rahimlu | Mirzanaq | Mizan | Moghvan | Mohamandust-e Olya | Mohammad Janlu | Mohammad Qoli Beyglu | Mohammad Taqi Kandi | Mohammadlu | Mohreh | Mokhtarabad | Molla Ahmad | Molla Bashi | Molla Kandi | Molla Yusef | Mollalu | Mollalu | Morad Ali Kandi | Moradlu | Moradlu | Moshtaqin | Mostafalu | Movil | Mowlan-e Olya | Mowlan-e Sofla | Murestan

N
Najaf Qoli Qeshlaqi | Namin | Naneh Karan | Naqareh | Naqdi Kandi | Naqdi-ye Olya | Naqdi-ye Sofla | Nar Qeshlaqi | Nariman | Narlu | Nasir Kandi | Nasir Kandi | Nasirabad | Nasirabad | Nasrabad | Nasrollah Beyglu | Natur | Navand | Navashanaq | Nazar Ali Bolaghi | Nazar Ali Kandi | Nemahil | Nesaz | Ney Ahmad Beyg | Nia Khorram | Niar | Niaraq | Niaz Sui | Niazqoli | Nilaq | Nir | Novashnaq | Now Deh | Now Deh | Now Shahr | Nowdeh | Nowjeh Deh | Nowlu | Nuli Bolagh | Nur Mohammad Kandi-ye Olya | Nur Mohammad Kandi-ye Sofla | Nur Mohammad Kandi-ye Vosta | Nuran | Nurollah Beyglu

O
Ojaq Alazar | Ojaq Qeshlaq-e Khoruslu | Ojaq Qeshlaqi | Ojaq Qoli Kandi | Oli Kandi | Olkash | Olmai-ye Olya | Olmai-ye Sofla | Omidcheh | Omidcheh | Ommabad | Omranabad | Onar | Ordukhan Kandi | Oruj Alilu | Oruj Qeshlaq-e Hajj Almas Khan | Oruj Qeshlaq-e Hajj Esmail | Oruj Qeshlaq-e Hajj Omran | Oruj Qeshlaq-e Morad | Orujabad | Owch Aghaj | Owch Bolagh | Owch Bolagh | Owch Bolagh | Owch Bolagh | Owch Darreh-ye Moghanlu Ogham Ali | Owchghaz-e Olya | Owchghaz-e Sofla | Owdlu | Owjur | Owlaghan | Owltan | Own Bir Beyglu | Owranj | Owrta Qeshlaq | Owzan Bolagh | Owzun Qui-ye Do | Owzun Qui-ye Yek

P
Palanglu | Panjeh Ali Kharabehsi | Para Qeshlaq | Para Qeshlaq-e Olya | Para Qeshlaq-e Sofla | Parchin | Parchin-e Olya | Parchin-e Sofla | Pardastlu | Pargu | Parikhan | Parsabad | Pashalu | Pateh Khvor | Peruj | Petelqan | Petli Kand | Pileh Daraq | Pileh Sehran | Pir Aghaj | Pir Alilu | Pir Alqar | Pir Alvan | Pir Aquam | Pir Bodagh | Pir Javar | Pir Zaman | Pirayuvatlu | Pirazmeyan | Pireh Khalil | Pirlu | Pirnaq | Pirzadeh | Pishgaman | Pormehr | Post Kandi

Q
Qabaleh Kandi | Qaderlu | Qahramanlu | Qaleh Barzand | Qaleh Juq | Qaleh Juq | Qaleh Juq-e Sabalan | Qaleh | Qalin Qayah | Qanbarlu | Qanlu Bolagh | Qar Qeshlaqi | Qarah Aghaj Poshteh | Qarah Aghaj | Qarah Aghaj-e Bala | Qarah Aghaj-e Pain | Qarah Baghlar | Qarah Bolagh | Qarah Chanaq | Qarah Daghlu | Qarah Gol | Qarah Gol | Qarah Hasanlu | Qarah Khan Beyglu | Qarah Qasemlu | Qarah Qayah | Qarah Qeshlaq | Qarah Qeshlaq | Qarah Quch | Qarah Saqqal-e Sofla | Qarah Shiran | Qarah Takanlu | Qarah Tappeh | Qarah Tappeh | Qarah Tappeh-ye Sabalan | Qarah Vali | Qarah Valilu | Qarah Yataq | Qarahchi-ye Olya | Qarahchi-ye Sofla | Qarahjah Aghle | Qarahlar | Qarahlu | Qarakh Bolagh | Qarash Qa Tappehsi-ye Olya | Qarash Qa Tappehsi-ye Sofla | Qaravaghli Ayibi | Qareh Malham | Qareh Qabaq-e Olya | Qareh Qabaq-e Sofla | Qareh Tekan | Qari Mazraehsi | Qasem Kandi | Qasem Kandi | Qasem Qeshlaqi | Qasem Qeshlaqi | Qashqa Qeshlaq-e Hajj Akbar | Qatarabad | Qatar-e Olya | Qatar-e Sofla | Qater Yuran-e Olya | Qater Yuran-e Sofla | Qayah Qeshlaqi | Qayeh Chaman | Qelich Khan Kandi | Qelich Khanlu | Qelich Qeshlaqi | Qelichi | Qerkh Bolagh | Qeshlaq Aghdash-e Bahram | Qeshlaq Aghdash-e Beyglar | Qeshlaq Aghdash-e Hasan Hazi Owghli | Qeshlaq Aghdash-e Mahmud | Qeshlaq Aghdash-e Nasir | Qeshlaq Amir Khanlu-ye Hajji Shakar | Qeshlaq Amir Khanlu-ye Hajji Tapduq | Qeshlaq Amir Khanlu-ye Moharramabad | Qeshlaq Amir Khanlu-ye Pol-e Rahman | Qeshlaq Amir Khanlu-ye Qarah Saqqal | Qeshlaq Chay | Qeshlaq | Qeshlaq-e Aba | Qeshlaq-e Aghjaran | Qeshlaq-e Ahmadi | Qeshlaq-e Aji Eshmeh-ye Ali Heydar Beyg | Qeshlaq-e Aji Eshmeh-ye Nurahmad | Qeshlaq-e Aji Eshmeh-ye Papur | Qeshlaq-e Alapapakh | Qeshlaq-e Ali Akbar Hamzeh | Qeshlaq-e Ali Karimi | Qeshlaq-e Ali Shansuyi | Qeshlaq-e Ali Shobani | Qeshlaq-e Alish | Qeshlaq-e Aq Borun | Qeshlaq-e Aqa Baba | Qeshlaq-e Aqa Khan-e Ekhtiar | Qeshlaq-e Arablu Asrafil | Qeshlaq-e Ayan Ali Barat | Qeshlaq-e Ayan Ali Samad | Qeshlaq-e Ayaq Ayiri Hajj Mohammad Ali | Qeshlaq-e Ayiri Darreh Hajj Chapar | Qeshlaq-e Ayiri Darreh Hajj Mahbat | Qeshlaq-e Ayyub Gikalu | Qeshlaq-e Azat | Qeshlaq-e Babakhan | Qeshlaq-e Babash-e Olya | Qeshlaq-e Babash-e Sofla | Qeshlaq-e Badeyr | Qeshlaq-e Bahman Shir | Qeshlaq-e Bakhshali | Qeshlaq-e Bakhtiar | Qeshlaq-e Balaja | Qeshlaq-e Baqersoli Ali Sahami | Qeshlaq-e Baqersoli Hajj Khan Ali | Qeshlaq-e Baqersoli Satar | Qeshlaq-e Barian | Qeshlaq-e Beyg Ali-ye Olya | Qeshlaq-e Beyg Ali-ye Sofla | Qeshlaq-e Beyg Ali-ye Vosta | Qeshlaq-e Buzcheh-ye Olya | Qeshlaq-e Buzcheh-ye Sofla-e Yek | Qeshlaq-e Chatameh Gholam | Qeshlaq-e Chenar | Qeshlaq-e Chortaqlu | Qeshlaq-e Chukhli Quyi Bahadruhamat | Qeshlaq-e Chukhli Quyi Hajj Akbar | Qeshlaq-e Chukhli Quyi Hajj Hasan Akhteri | Qeshlaq-e Chukhli Quyi Hajj Hasan Ali | Qeshlaq-e Chukhli Quyi Hajj Ramazan | Qeshlaq-e Chukhli Quyi Hoseyn Aq Bashlar | Qeshlaq-e Chukhli Quyi Khodash | Qeshlaq-e Damirchluy-e Qarah Qeshlaq Hajj Abil | Qeshlaq-e Damirchluy-e Qarah Qeshlaq-e Hajj Majid | Qeshlaq-e Diz | Qeshlaq-e Dowlama | Qeshlaq-e Eslamabad-e Shomareh-ye Do | Qeshlaq-e Eslamabad-e Shomareh-ye Seh | Qeshlaq-e Esmail Khan Jalil Ranjaber | Qeshlaq-e Esmail Khan Mohammad Izadi | Qeshlaq-e Faraj Esmail | Qeshlaq-e Faraj Hajj Owraj | Qeshlaq-e Faraj Moharram | Qeshlaq-e Farajollah Hajj Sarkhan | Qeshlaq-e Farajollah Nemaz | Qeshlaq-e Farajollah Qadir | Qeshlaq-e Gablu | Qeshlaq-e Gadilu | Qeshlaq-e Galam Ali Hajj Hoseyn | Qeshlaq-e Galam Ali Hajj Savad | Qeshlaq-e Galam Ali Safar | Qeshlaq-e Ghazanfar-e Bala | Qeshlaq-e Gilvan | Qeshlaq-e Gowmir Chinlu-ye Owrtadagh | Qeshlaq-e Guneshli | Qeshlaq-e Gurchinlu Hajj Beyuk | Qeshlaq-e Gurchinlu Hajj Najaf | Qeshlaq-e Hadli | Qeshlaq-e Hajj Abish Hajj Mosum | Qeshlaq-e Hajj Ali Barat | Qeshlaq-e Hajj Ali Qoli Abdol | Qeshlaq-e Hajj Ali Qoli Ayaz | Qeshlaq-e Hajj Ali Qoli Jafar | Qeshlaq-e Hajj Ali Qoli Jelal va Khan Aqa | Qeshlaq-e Hajj Almas Khan | Qeshlaq-e Hajj Aman | Qeshlaq-e Hajj Amir Forman | Qeshlaq-e Hajj Amir Maherem | Qeshlaq-e Hajj Amir Mashhadi Safer | Qeshlaq-e Hajj Aqa Nasir Owgholu | Qeshlaq-e Hajj Aqaqoli | Qeshlaq-e Hajj Aspar Kandi | Qeshlaq-e Hajj Aymanlu Mahteman | Qeshlaq-e Hajj Dalan Khan Hoseyn Khodayar | Qeshlaq-e Hajj Dowlat Ahmad | Qeshlaq-e Hajj Dowlat Savad | Qeshlaq-e Hajj Dowlat Yadollah | Qeshlaq-e Hajj Fathali | Qeshlaq-e Hajj Fathali Mansur | Qeshlaq-e Hajj Hashem Arshad | Qeshlaq-e Hajj Hashem-e Neysar | Qeshlaq-e Hajj Heydar Farman | Qeshlaq-e Hajj Heydar Gol Ahmad | Qeshlaq-e Hajj Hoseyn Khan | Qeshlaq-e Hajj Khan Hoseyn Samid | Qeshlaq-e Hajj Mahmud | Qeshlaq-e Hajj Shirin Mosib | Qeshlaq-e Hajj Soleyman Akbar Keramati | Qeshlaq-e Hajj Soleyman-e Ali Goshad Teymuri | Qeshlaq-e Hajj Taleb | Qeshlaq-e Hajj Tumar Hajj Jamshid Shahbazi | Qeshlaq-e Hajji Abbas | Qeshlaq-e Hajji Abish Hajj Rahim | Qeshlaq-e Hajji Allahverdi | Qeshlaq-e Hajji Avaz | Qeshlaq-e Hajji Ayman Kandi-ye Olya | Qeshlaq-e Hajji Balakhan | Qeshlaq-e Hajji Bayandar | Qeshlaq-e Hajji Dowlat Badar | Qeshlaq-e Hajji Gholam | Qeshlaq-e Hajji Hasan Hajj Eslam | Qeshlaq-e Hajji Hasan | Qeshlaq-e Hajji Heydar Havar | Qeshlaq-e Hajji Nasi | Qeshlaq-e Hajji Panjalu | Qeshlaq-e Hajji Qujakhan | Qeshlaq-e Hajji Samid | Qeshlaq-e Hajji Savad | Qeshlaq-e Hajji Siab | Qeshlaq-e Hatem | Qeshlaq-e Hezarat Qoli Abdollah | Qeshlaq-e Hezarat Qoli Abu ol Hasan | Qeshlaq-e Hezarat Qoli Bakhtiar | Qeshlaq-e Hezarat Qoli Gholam | Qeshlaq-e Hoseyn Narimani | Qeshlaq-e Ilkhchi-ye Olya | Qeshlaq-e Ilkhchi-ye Sofla | Qeshlaq-e Iman Quyi Mashhad Ali | Qeshlaq-e Iman Quyi Mohammad Jalili | Qeshlaq-e Jafar Qoli | Qeshlaq-e Jahan Khanemlu | Qeshlaq-e Jalilu | Qeshlaq-e Jeda | Qeshlaq-e Kazem Owghlan | Qeshlaq-e Kazem Owghlan Asghar | Qeshlaq-e Khalillu Aziz | Qeshlaq-e Khalillu Gholam | Qeshlaq-e Khalilu Heydar | Qeshlaq-e Khan Goldi Bala Owghlan | Qeshlaq-e Khan Goldi Davakishi | Qeshlaq-e Khan Goldi Hajj Ahmad | Qeshlaq-e Khan Goldi Kamaran | Qeshlaq-e Khan Goldi Mostanlu | Qeshlaq-e Khan Goldi Ogham Owghlan | Qeshlaq-e Khan Hoseyn Vadelan Hajj Mohammad Taqi | Qeshlaq-e Khan Hoseyn Vadelan Teymur | Qeshlaq-e Khan Owghlan | Qeshlaq-e Luleh Darreh Hajji Hasan | Qeshlaq-e Luleh Darreh Jamshid | Qeshlaq-e Malek Kandi | Qeshlaq-e Mazan-e Olya | Qeshlaq-e Mehr Ali Kandi | Qeshlaq-e Melli Hajji Hamat | Qeshlaq-e Melli Mahmudlar | Qeshlaq-e Mira Alam | Qeshlaq-e Mohammad Beyg-e Olya | Qeshlaq-e Mohammad Beyg-e Sofla | Qeshlaq-e Mohammad Qoli | Qeshlaq-e Molla Naqi Aqam Owghlan | Qeshlaq-e Molla Naqi Qanbar | Qeshlaq-e Muzuhlar | Qeshlaq-e Nariman Kandi Amir Aslan | Qeshlaq-e Nariman Kandi Hajj Khan Owghlan | Qeshlaq-e Nariman Kandi Hajji Havar | Qeshlaq-e Ojaq-e Yek | Qeshlaq-e Olya | Qeshlaq-e Owch Ali Savad | Qeshlaq-e Owch Ali Shahamati | Qeshlaq-e Owch Bolagh | Qeshlaq-e Owch Bolaq | Qeshlaq-e Owch Darreh al Tafat | Qeshlaq-e Owch Quyi Ali Akbar | Qeshlaq-e Owch Quyi Hajj Hasan Shayiqi | Qeshlaq-e Owrtadagh-e Esmail | Qeshlaq-e Owrtadagh-e Hajjiabad | Qeshlaq-e Owrtadagh-e Tapaduq | Qeshlaq-e Padar Eys Khan | Qeshlaq-e Padar Hajji Bahrish | Qeshlaq-e Padarjamal | Qeshlaq-e Pasha | Qeshlaq-e Pelazir | Qeshlaq-e Qabaleh Gah Abbas Ali | Qeshlaq-e Qabaleh Gah Ali Aslan | Qeshlaq-e Qabaleh Gah Allah Vardi va Paper | Qeshlaq-e Qabaleh Gah Gol Aslan | Qeshlaq-e Qaharmanlu | Qeshlaq-e Qahreman | Qeshlaq-e Qanbarlu Hajj Mohammad Hasan | Qeshlaq-e Qanbarlu Rostam Qanbarlui-ye Vosta | Qeshlaq-e Qanbarlui-ye Olya | Qeshlaq-e Qarah Darreh-ye Asam Khan Asad | Qeshlaq-e Qarah Darreh-ye Asam Khan Azadkhan | Qeshlaq-e Qarah Darreh-ye Asam Khan Hajj Sadallah | Qeshlaq-e Qarah Darreh-ye Asam Khan Kishi | Qeshlaq-e Qarah Darreh-ye Asam Khan Safar Kandi | Qeshlaq-e Qarah Darreh-ye Asam Khan Tahraj | Qeshlaq-e Qarah Darreh-ye Aziz Rostam | Qeshlaq-e Qarah Darreh-ye Hajji Alish | Qeshlaq-e Qarah Darreh-ye Kahel Qeshlaq Farasat | Qeshlaq-e Qarah Darreh-ye Kahel va Qeshlaq-e Hajji Shahverdi | Qeshlaq-e Qarah Jalu Hajji Iman | Qeshlaq-e Qarah Jalu Hajji Sadeq | Qeshlaq-e Qarah Kakil Ayaz | Qeshlaq-e Qarah Kakil Hajji Mahmud | Qeshlaq-e Qarah Kakil Matleb | Qeshlaq-e Qarah Qayeh | Qeshlaq-e Qarah Takanlu Amrollah | Qeshlaq-e Qarah Tappeh Maleklar | Qeshlaq-e Qarah Tappeh Tamaq Ali | Qeshlaq-e Qaravgholi Jabar | Qeshlaq-e Qareh Seqal | Qeshlaq-e Qarqoli Rahim Talbi | Qeshlaq-e Qirlu | Qeshlaq-e Qitranlu Hajj Mohammad Kandi | Qeshlaq-e Quja Hajji Khosrow | Qeshlaq-e Quzlu | Qeshlaq-e Rostam | Qeshlaq-e Sadi Kandi | Qeshlaq-e Safar Ali Ghib Ali | Qeshlaq-e Safar Ali Nosrat | Qeshlaq-e Salman va Alman | Qeshlaq-e Sarabad | Qeshlaq-e Sari Quyi Ahmad Khan | Qeshlaq-e Sari Quyi Mikail | Qeshlaq-e Sari Quyi Shahmar | Qeshlaq-e Sarudlu Kandi | Qeshlaq-e Seyf Khanlu-ye Do | Qeshlaq-e Seyf Khanlu-ye Yek | Qeshlaq-e Seyyedlar Dadalu Hoseyn Ali | Qeshlaq-e Seyyedlar Dadalu Yidallah | Qeshlaq-e Seyyedlar Sari Quyi Hajj Bayram | Qeshlaq-e Seyyedlar-e Seyfollah | Qeshlaq-e Seyyedlari Sari Quyi Moradlu | Qeshlaq-e Shah Khanem Ali Borat | Qeshlaq-e Shah Khanem Qadir | Qeshlaq-e Sufi Hasan | Qeshlaq-e Sufi Qadir | Qeshlaq-e Sufilar Hajj Mirza Ali Aqa | Qeshlaq-e Sufilar Hamid | Qeshlaq-e Sumuklu Heydar | Qeshlaq-e Sumuklu Mayir | Qeshlaq-e Tak Quyi Matlab va Ali Khan | Qeshlaq-e Tak Quyi Qarah Piran | Qeshlaq-e Takqui-ye Qarah Piran-e Hazrat-e Qoli | Qeshlaq-e Tang | Qeshlaq-e Tarrehchi | Qeshlaq-e Tulkilu Gol Moradi | Qeshlaq-e Tulkilu Gujehlar | Qeshlaq-e Tumar | Qeshlaq-e Tumar Hajj Sad | Qeshlaq-e Yilatan Hajj Abbas | Qeshlaq-e Yilatan ol Hurdi Dowlat | Qeshlaq-e Zaviyeh | Qeshlaq-e Zeynal-e Olya | Qezel Daraq | Qezel Guney | Qezel Qayah | Qilpenlu-ye Olya | Qilpenlu-ye Sofla | Qilulu | Qinarjeh | Qitranlu Soltani | Qiz Qalehsi | Qobad Kandi | Qoli Beyglu | Qonan Qaran | Qorbanlu | Qosabeh | Qowsheh-ye Olya | Qowsheh-ye Sofla | Quja Beyglu | Quldur Kohli | Quri Daraq | Qurlu | Qurt Tappeh | Qurt Tappeh | Qurtlu Qeshlaq | Qurtulmush | Qusajin | Qusha Qeshlaq-e Hasan | Qusha Qeshlaq-e Khasai | Qusha Qeshlaq-e Mansur va Rahman | Qusha Qeshlaq-e Qambai | Qusha Qeshlaq-e Rezali Beyg | Qutur Bolagh | Quytul | Quzlu | Quzlu | Quzlu

R
Rahim Beyglui-ye Olya | Rahim Beyglui-ye Sofla | Rahim Kandi | Rahimlu | Rahimlui-ye Muran | Ravindazaq | Raz | Razamgah | Razi | Raziabad | Rezaqoli-ye Qeshlaqi | Rostamabad | Rowshanaq | Ruh Kandi

S
Saadat Bolaghi | Sachlu | Saghirlu | Saheb Divan | Said Khanlu | Saidabad | Sain | Sain | Salaleh | Salavat | Saleh Qeshlaqi | Salman Kandi | Salmanabad | Saluk Qeshlaqi | Samadlu | Samanlui-ye Bozorg | Samarin | Samian | Sangabad | Saqqavaz | Saqqezchi | Saqqezchi | Saqsolu | Sarband | Sarbanlar | Sardabeh | Sardi | Sareyn | Sari Bolagh | Sari Daraq | Sari Nasirlu | Sari Qayah | Sari Qeshlaq | Sarikhanlu | Sarilar | Sarkhai Beyglu | Sarvaghaji | Sati-ye Olya | Sati-ye Sofla | Sati-ye Vosta | Savareh | Savoj Bolagh | Savojbolagh | Sayadabad | Sefid Ab | Sejahrud | Sekarabad | Seqdel | Seqizchi | Seyf Khanlu | Seyfabad | Seyyed Beyglu | Seyyed Javadlu | Seyyed Kandi | Seyyed Kandi | Seyyed Lar | Seyyed Mohammadlu | Seyyedabad | Seyyedlar-e Zahra | Shabanlu | Shabanlu | Shabi Kandi | Shablu | Shaerlu | Shahab ol Din | Shahbazlu | Shahid Mohammadpur | Shahmar Beyglu | Shahrak-e Gharbi | Shahrak-e Vali Asr | Shahrivar | Shahsavarlu | Shakar Ab | Shal | Sham Asbi | Shamsabad | Shamsabad | Shamsabad | Shamsabad | Shamshir Khani | Shamsir | Sharafabad | Sharafeh | Sharajabad | Sharif Beyglu | Shater Gonbadi | Shavir | Shavon-e Olya | Shavon-e Sofla | Shayeq | Shekarlui-ye Olya | Shender Shami | Sheykh Ahmad | Sheykh Alilar | Sheykh Azimlu | Sheykh Mohammadlu | Sheykh Razi | Sheykhlar | Sheykhlu | Shilveh-ye Olya | Shilveh-ye Sofla | Shiran | Shirin Bolagh | Shisheh Garan | Shur Bolagh | Shur Daraq-e Olya | Shur Daraq-e Sofla | Shur Gol | Shurestan | Shurgol | Shurqui | Shush Bolagh | Siah Push | Siah | Siavosh Kandi | Sineh Sar | Sobhanlu | Sohrababad | Sohrablu | Soltan Qeshlaqi | Soltanabad | Solut | Somokluy-e Olya | Somokluy-e Sofla | Sorkhab | Sorkhanlu | Sowghanlu | Sowmaeh | Sowmeeh-ye Rudbar | Suflu | Suha | Sula | Suli Daraq | Sulugoli Gol | Suran | Sureh Barq | Susahab

T
Tabrizaq | Taharom Dasht | Tahmasebabad | Taj Boyuk | Tajaraq | Tak Bolagh Angut | Tak Bolagh-e Arshaq | Tak Dam | Tak Dam | Takah Chi | Takahchi | Takanlu | Takleh-ye Abbasabad-e Olya | Takleh-ye Abbasabad-e Sofla | Takleh-ye Bakhsh-e Do | Takleh-ye Bakhsh-e Yek | Taleb Qeshlaqi | Talkan | Tamerdash | Tang | Tapalqa | Tappeh Bashi | Tappeh | Tappeh | Taqcheh Dash | Taqi Dizaj | Taqi Kandi | Taqi Kandi | Tarazuj | Tarbat Kandi | Tarhamabad | Tark | Tarkeh Deh | Tarzanaq | Tavus Darrehsi | Tazeh Kand Gandomabad | Tazeh Kand | Tazeh Kand-e Angut | Tazeh Kand-e Galvazan | Tazeh Kand-e Hajji Khan | Tazeh Kand-e Jadid | Tazeh Kand-e Kian | Tazeh Kand-e Langan | Tazeh Kand-e Loqmanabad | Tazeh Kand-e Mohammadiyeh | Tazeh Kand-e Muran | Tazeh Kand-e Qadim | Tazeh Kand-e Qarah Bolagh | Tazeh Kand-e Rezaabad | Tazeh Kand-e Sabalan | Tazeh Kand-e Sharifabad | Tazeh Kand-e Yuzbashi | Tazeh Qeshlaq | Tazehabad | Tazehabad-e Tumar | Tazehkand-e Chenaq | Tighiyeh | Til | Timur Kandi | Tobnaq | Topraqlu | Towlash | Tulan | Tulir | Tulun | Tumar Darrahsi-ye Olya | Tumar Darrahsi-ye Sofla | Tumar Kandi | Tumaraqa Khan | Tupraq Kandi | Tusanlui-ye Barzand | Tushmanlu | Tutunsez | Tuyestan

U
Ucheh | Umaslan-e Olya | Umaslan-e Sofla | Ur | Urtlu | Uzun Tappeh-ye Olya | Uzun Tappeh-ye Sofla

V
Vakilabad | Vali Asr | Vali Beyglu | Vali Mamilu | Valiabad | Vanan | Van-e Olya | Van-e Sofla | Vanestanaq | Vareh Now | Varesabad | Vargeh Saran | Varniab | Vechin | Virseq | Viu | Viyand-e Kalkhvoran | Viz Darreh

Y
Yajlu | Yal Dagarmani | Yamchi-ye Olya | Yamchi-ye Sofla | Yan Bolagh | Yaychi | Yedi Daraq | Yekvan | Yelsui | Yelujeh | Yengejeh | Yengejeh | Yengejeh-ye Molla Mohammad Hasan | Yengejeh-ye Molla Mohammad Reza | Yengejeh-ye Qeshlaq | Yengejeh-ye Reza Beyglu | Yeznabad | Yunjalu | Yusefkhan Kandi | Yuzbash Mahallehsi | Yuznab

Z
Zahra | Zakilu | Zal Qoli Kandi | Zangebar | Zardalu | Zareabad | Zargar | Zargar-e Goli Bolaghi | Zarjabad | Zartoshtabad | Zaviyeh Sang | Zaviyeh-ye Jafarabad | Zaviyeh-ye Kivi | Zaviyeh-ye Kord | Zaviyeh-ye Sadat | Zaviyeh-ye Zarjabad | Zenab | Zengir | Zir Zamin | Ziveh

Administratively

References

 
Ardabil Province